Worley Thorne is an American screenwriter, television writer, script consultant and adjunct assistant professor of composition, critical thinking and screenwriting. Thorne's work as a writer encompasses hourlong television drama, and feature film scripts, in a wide variety of genres, including science fiction, fantasy, detective and mystery, legal drama, soap opera, medical drama, animal fiction and family drama.

Early life
Thorne was born in New York City New York, as Roscoe Worley Thorne II, to Gerald Roscoe Thorne, a sometime model, Broadway chorus boy and salesman, and Teri Goldenberg Thorne, a chorus girl and garment samplemaker, who eventually rose through the ranks to become a ladies fashion designer.  Gerald had been raised in Indiana by his parents, Dr. Roscoe Worley Thorne I, a physician and Methodist minister and Pearl Garner Thorne.  Teri had been born, and spent her teen years in, Benedek-falva, Hungary, to Alexander Goldenberg, a designer-builder of monuments and the village's innkeeper, and Szerena Markovits Goldenberg, daughter of a Jewish rabbi. 
Thorne was raised in the Bronx, where he attended the Bronx High School of Science, a school for gifted students. He graduated from the City University of New York City College, with a B.A. in English, and in May 2011, received his M.A. with honors in English literature from California State University Northridge.  He is married to Patricia Thorne, a poet, fiction, prose,  and non-fiction writer who received her M.F.A in creative writing with Honors from Antioch University Los Angeles in 2017. She is published in university periodicals, and has  a forthcoming fiction novel soon to be published.

Career
Worley Thorne's work includes scripts for Star Trek: The Next Generation, The Paper Chase, Fantasy Island, Dallas, Barnaby Jones, Cannon, Charlie's Angels, The Life and Times of Grizzly Adams, Doctors' Private Lives and others. He adapted a screenplay in English, based on a French original, titled "Albert's Piano," for Italian producer Marcello Danon (best known for "La Cage Aux Folles.") Other feature film screenplays include "Swift, Silent Deadly" for Becker Productions and "Natural Affection," based on the play by William Inge, for Bassey Productions. His original screenplay "The Yankee," based in the American Revolution, was written for Becker Productions.

Thorne is a past Governor of the Academy of Television Arts and Sciences, the body which determines and gives out Emmy Awards. He is an emeritus member of the Writers Guild of America, west, was chairman of several Guild committees and involved in aiding in organization and supervision of past strikes by the union. Thorne taught screenwriting at Columbia College Hollywood, Los Angeles, for four years, and for several years was a publicist representing entertainment industry, corporate and political clients.

Credits
Paramount Pictures
Star Trek: The Next Generation:
Justice, November 9, 1987 (episode 1.8)
Star Trek: Phase II
Are Unheard Melodies Sweet? (series was unproduced by Paramount, in favor of making motion pictures of Star Trek)

Lorimar Television
Dallas
The Kristin Affair, October 19, 1979 (episode 3.5)
Runaway, October 28, 1978 (episode 2.7)

ABC-TV
Fantasy Island:
The Pirate, September 23, 1979  (episode 2.2)
I Want to Get Married, October 21, 1978 (episode 2.5)
The Swinger,  February 9, 1980 (episode 3.19)
Crescendo,  December 20, 1980 (episode 4.8)
The Devil’s Triangle, May 2, 1981 (episode 4.21)
To Fly with Eagles, January 21, 1984  #144 (episode 7.12)
Charlie's Angels:
Game Set, Death, January 4, 1978 (episode 2.14)
Doctors' Private Lives:
Buddy System
Westside Medical:
The Sound of Sunlight (debut episode 1.1)
Executive Script Consultant for series
The Swiss Family Robinson:
The Captain, November 30, 1975 (episode 1.12)

CBS-TV
Blade in Hong Kong, Movie, Becker Enterprises, Creative Consultant
The Paper Chase:
The Tables Down at Ernie’s, March 27, 1979 (episode 1.19)
Executive Script Consultant for series, Season 1
The Lazarus Syndrome
Cannon:
The Cure That Kills, February 20, 1974 (episode 3.21)
Moving Target January 13, 1973 (episode 2.17)
Barnaby Jones:
The Marathon Murders, February 17, 1977 (episode 5.16)
The Lonely Victims, January 8, 1976 (episode 4.16)
Apple's Way:
The  Real Thanksgiving, November 24, 1974 (episode 2.10)
The Outing, January 5, 1975 (episode 2.14)
Executive Script Consultant for series, Season 2

NBC-TV
The Life and Times of Grizzly Adams
Track of the Cougar, December 14, 1977, (episode 2.21)
The Seekers January 25, 1978
The Bionic Woman:
Jamie's Mother, March 24, 1976 (episode 1.8)

References

2. American Film Institute, Guide to College Courses in Film and Television, 1975, 
 American Film, vol. 5, nos. 1–10, pp. 34.
 Blum, Daniel and John A. Willis. Daniel Blum's Theatre World, vol. 21, pp. 42, 43
 Bohnenkamp, Dennis R. and Sam L. Grogg. Guide to College Courses in Film and Television (1978). p. 37.  
 Choice: Publication of the Association of College and Research Libraries. vol. 3, nos. 8–12.
 Gianakos, Larry James. Television Drama Series Programming: A Comprehensive Chronicle, 1984-1986. vol. 6. pp. 279.  
 Greenberger, Robert. Star Trek: The Complete Unauthorized History. p. 150. .
 Gross, Edward. Making of the Next Generation. p. 59. 
 Hirschfeld, Burt. Ewings of Dallas. .
 John Willis' Theatre World, vol. 21, p. 43.
 Jones, Mark and Lance Parkin. Beyond the Final Frontier (Star Trek). pp. 64, 80. 
 Lewis, Jon E. and Penny Stempel. Cult TV: The Essential Critical Guide. p. 61.
 Martindale, David. Television Detective Shows of the 1970s. pp. 37, 67.
 McGilligan, Patrick. Robert Altman: Jumping Off the Cliff. p. 234. 
 Morris, Bruce B. Prime Time Network Serials. p. 75.  
 Muir, John Kenneth. The Encyclopedia of Superheroes on Film and Television. p. 130. 
 Naylor, Lynne. Television Writers Guide, vol. 50, p. 21, 436, 441. 
 Nevins, Francis M. Paul Landres: A Director's Stories. pp. 182, 183. 
 New York Theatre Critics' Reviews, vols. 25–26. p. 410.
 Porter, Jennifer E. and Darcee L. McLaren. Star Trek and Sacred Ground: Explorations of Star Trek. p. 274.  
 Robb, Brian J. A Brief Guide to Star Trek. 
 Roddenberry, Gene and Susan Sackett. The Making of Star Trek—The Motion Picture. p. 48. 
 Rosenstand, Nina. The Moral of the Story: An Introduction to Ethics. p. 251. 
 Schuster, Hal and Wendy Rathbone. Trek: The Unauthorized A-Z. p. 232. 
 Terrace, Vincent. Encyclopedia of Television Series, Pilots and Specials. p. 84. 
 Van Hise, James. The History of Trek. pp. 54, 129. 
 Van Hise, James. Trek: The Next Generation. p. 53. 
 Wagner, Laura. Anne Francis: The Life and Career. p. 214. 
 World Theatre, vol. 14 (1965), p. 203.

External links

 https://www.ratemyprofessors.com/ShowRatings.jsp?tid=1965751
 https://www.lavc.edu/english-department/Faculty.aspx

City College of New York alumni
Writers from New York City
American television executives
American television writers
American male television writers
Year of birth missing (living people)
Living people
Screenwriters from New York (state)
The Bronx High School of Science alumni